Juan Francisco Moreno Fuertes (born 11 September 1988), known as Juanfran, is a Spanish professional footballer who plays mainly as a right-back but also as a right winger for Real Oviedo.

He made 197 appearances in La Liga, chiefly for Deportivo de La Coruña but also with Getafe, Real Madrid, Betis and Leganés. He also competed professionally in Turkey.

Club career

Getafe
Born in Madrid, Juanfran joined local Getafe CF's youth ranks aged 17, making his senior debut in 2007 with the reserves in the Tercera División. On 12 March 2008 he played his first official game with the first team, coming on as a substitute for Jaime Gavilán in the last minutes of a 1–0 home win against S.L. Benfica in the round of 16 of the UEFA Cup (3–1 aggregate win). His first La Liga appearance came 11 days later, also from the bench, in a 1–0 loss at Athletic Bilbao.

Real Madrid
After one year with Villarreal CF's reserves in the Segunda División B, which ended in promotion, a first-ever for the team, Juanfran returned to his hometown and signed with Real Madrid. He spent the vast majority of his first seasons with the club with Real Madrid Castilla, also in the third tier.

Juanfran made his debut with the first team on 2 May 2010, replacing Fernando Gago in a home league fixture against CA Osasuna, with five minutes to go: the score was then at 2–2, but the Merengues eventually won 3–2 thanks to a Cristiano Ronaldo goal.

Betis
In early June 2013, Juanfran agreed to join Real Betis on a free transfer. He scored his first goal in the Spanish top flight on 11 May of the following year, in a 4–3 home victory over Real Valladolid, but the Andalusians were relegated as last.

Deportivo
On 1 September 2014, Juanfran moved to Deportivo de La Coruña in a season-long loan deal and also agreed a contract with Watford, with the latter move being made effective in July 2015 for a fee of around £1.5 million.

Juanfran returned to Dépor on 16 July 2015, on loan for one year. The following summer, even though newspaper La Voz de Galicia initially reported an agreement had been reached to a permanent four-year deal after the English club received a compensation, he was again loaned to the Spaniards who now had a buying option.

Juanfran signed permanently for Deportivo in July 2017, and was a regular starter as they suffered relegation. On 12 July 2018, he was loaned to top-division side CD Leganés for one year.

Alanyaspor
On 29 July 2019, Juanfran rescinded his Deportivo contract with a year remaining by mutual consent to join Alanyaspor of Turkey's Super Lig, signing a two-year deal with the option of a third the same day. He made 97 competitive appearances during his spell.

Later career
On 23 June 2022, Juanfran joined Málaga CF as a free agent, agreeing to a one-year contract with the option for another one. He terminated his link with the club the following 9 January after being deemed surplus to requirements by manager Pepe Mel, and, later that day, signed for fellow second-tier Real Oviedo.

Career statistics

Honours
Real Madrid
Copa del Rey: 2010–11

Real Madrid Castilla
Segunda División B: 2011–12

References

External links

1988 births
Living people
Spanish footballers
Footballers from Madrid
Association football defenders
Association football wingers
La Liga players
Segunda División players
Segunda División B players
Tercera División players
Getafe CF B players
Getafe CF footballers
Villarreal CF B players
Real Madrid Castilla footballers
Real Madrid CF players
Real Betis players
Deportivo de La Coruña players
CD Leganés players
Málaga CF players
Real Oviedo players
Watford F.C. players
Süper Lig players
Alanyaspor footballers
Spanish expatriate footballers
Expatriate footballers in Turkey
Spanish expatriate sportspeople in Turkey